Mutinta Hichilema is the current First Lady of Zambia, having assumed the role after her husband, Hakainde Hichilema, was elected as President of Zambia in August 2021. She is known for her commitment to humanitarian causes and her active involvement in community development programs across Zambia.

Personal life
As a devout member of the Seventh-day Adventist Church, Hichilema has been an advocate for religious tolerance and interfaith harmony in Zambia. Her work has focused on promoting unity and understanding among people of different faiths, and she has been involved in several initiatives to promote social cohesion and national development.

References

First Ladies of Zambia
Living people
United Party for National Development politicians
Date of birth missing (living people)
1967 births